"Already Gone" is a song co-written and recorded by American country music duo Sugarland.  It was released in September 2008 as the second single from their album Love on the Inside, which was released on July 29, 2008. Sugarland's members, Kristian Bush and Jennifer Nettles, wrote the song with Bobby Pinson, with whom the duo also co-wrote two of their previous singles, "Want To" and "All I Want to Do".

Content
"Already Gone" is a mid-tempo ballad set in triple meter, mostly accompanied by piano and mandolin, the latter of which is played by Bush. The female narrator describes her life and always passing the good moments by. The song describes the narrator's relationship with her mother and a relationship with her now ex-boyfriend and the final encounter she has with him before moving on.

According to Country Weekly magazine, Bobby Pinson met Nettles and Bush at their hotel in Buffalo, New York in the middle of their 2007 tour. Nettles and Bush played a melody that "sounds like [Pinson]." Nettles added the final verse about her divorce from Todd Van Sickle.

Critical reception
Engine 145 critic Brady Vercher gave the song a "thumbs down" rating. Although said as "a little more substance" than its predecessor "All I Want to Do", he also thought that more emphasis was placed on constructing an interesting melody than creating a narrative that is anything more than average.

Music video
A music video for the song was released on iTunes a few days before its official release to CMT and GAC on September 5, 2008.  The video starts off with Nettles and Bush in a bed of old, vintage cars with a sunset in the background.  It later captures a young girl in the driver's side of one of those cars, which turns out to be Nettles at the end. Nettles sings on the hood of one car, while Bush plays mandolin on the hood of a different car.

Chart performance
The song debuted at #47 on the Hot Country Songs chart the week of the song's release on September 8, 2008. On the chart week of January 17, 2009, it became the duo's fourth Number One song in the U.S..

Year-end charts

References

2000s ballads
2008 singles
2008 songs
Sugarland songs
Songs written by Jennifer Nettles
Songs written by Kristian Bush
Songs written by Bobby Pinson
Music videos directed by Shaun Silva
Country ballads
Song recordings produced by Byron Gallimore
Mercury Records singles